The Troll A platform is a Condeep gravity-based structure offshore natural gas platform in the Troll gas field off the west coast of Norway. Built from reinforced concrete, it was the tallest structure that has ever been moved to another position, relative to the surface of the Earth, and is among the largest and most complex engineering projects in history.  The platform was a televised sensation when it was towed into the North Sea in 1996, where it is now operated by Equinor. It is often incorrectly referenced as the heaviest object ever moved as well, but it is actually the second heaviest after another Condeep Oil platform the Gullfaks C, which had a displacement approaching 1.5 million tons in comparison with Troll A's 1.2 million.Troll A was towed from the afternoon 10 May 1995 until the platform was in place 17 May 1995. It was lowered to the seabed in 303 meters of water, and had penetrated 36 meters into the soil 19 May 1995. It was self-supporting with no further mooring required.

Dimensions

The platform stands on four legs extending down to the sea floor 303 meters (994 feet) below the surface of the sea, and the leg containing the import and export risers has an elevator that takes over nine minutes to travel from the platform above the waves to the sea floor.

The legs must be able to withstand intense pressures, so the walls of Troll A's legs are over 1 metre thick and are made of steel-reinforced concrete that was formed in one continuous poura lengthy process that takes 20 minutes per 5 cm laid.  Each leg is a mathematically joined composite of several conical cylinders that flares out smoothly to greater diameters at the top and bottom, so each support is somewhat wasp-waisted when viewed in profile and circular in any cross-section (see picture at right).

The four legs are joined by a "chord shortener" (not present in the picture at right), a reinforced concrete box connecting the legs that damps out any potentially destructive wave-leg resonances by retuning the legs' natural frequencies. Each leg is also sub-divided along its length into compartments a third of the way from each end which act as independent water-tight compartments.

Construction
Troll A was built by Norwegian Contractors for Norske Shell, with base construction beginning in September 1991 at a cost of 4150 million NOK, or approximately US$650 million at the time. The base and the deck were built separately, and were joined in 1998 while the base was partially submerged. The base is a Condeep gravity base structure built from reinforced concrete.

The tow took seven days.

Expansion
In the autumn of 2010 the Troll A platform was expanded with a new module. This module contains living quarters and a new control room. The new control room and expanded facilities are needed to support the new compressors (a third and fourth are planned and being installed in 2014). These compressors are needed due to the dropping reservoir pressure in the wells.

On 18 June 2013 the new support module M12 for compressors 3 and 4 was lifted on board Troll A. The increased electricity consumption of these compressors required new power cables from shore, and due to grid constraints the platform is cut off from shore power if a grid emergency arises.

Operation
Gas rises from 40 wells and is exported through a number of pipes to a processing plant at Kollsnes. Troll A is scheduled to receive two additional gas compressors to increase production volume and compensate for dropping reservoir pressure in the wells.

World records
In 1996, the platform set the Guinness World Record for the largest offshore gas platform.

In 2006, the 10th anniversary of Statoil's operatorship of Troll gas production was celebrated with a concert by Katie Melua held at the base of one of the hollow legs of the platform.

See also

 HVDC Troll
 Ursa tension leg platform, another, taller record-breaking platform
 Magnolia extended tension leg platform, the world's deepest ETLP

References

External links
 
 Offshore-Technology.com: Troll

Natural gas platforms
Natural gas industry in Norway
North Sea energy
Equinor
1996 establishments in Norway